Laughing Down Crying is the fifth solo album by American recording artist Daryl Hall. It was released on September 27, 2011, on Verve Records. Co-producer and bandmate T-Bone Wolk died during early recording sessions for the disc; Hall dedicated the record to him. Hall debuted the album on a two-part episode of his series Live from Daryl's House.

Track listing
 All tracks written and composed by Daryl Hall except as noted.

Singles
The lead single, "Talking To You (Is Like Talking To Myself)", reached number 16 on the Adult Contemporary chart on the November 12, 2011 issue, it stayed there for two weeks and remained on the chart for twenty weeks and it was the most successful song of the album.

The album's single of the same name peaked at number five on the Billboard's Smooth Jazz Songs chart on November 26, 2011 staying there for a week and remaining on the chart for 20 weeks.

"Eyes For You" went to number 23 on the Adult Contemporary chart on July 14, 2012 staying there for a week and remained on the chart for 14 weeks.

Charts

Personnel 
 Daryl Hall – lead and backing vocals, keyboards, acoustic guitars, electric guitars, synth bass, percussion
 Greg Bieck – keyboards, drum programming
 John Fields –  keyboards (3), synth bass (10), drum programming (10)
 Paul Pesco – acoustic guitars,  electric guitars, bass (1, 6)
 T-Bone Wolk – acoustic guitar (3, 7, 10), bass (3, 7, 10)
 Zev Katz – bass (1, 2, 9)
 Jerry Duplessis – bass (9)
 Shawn Pelton – drums (1, 3, 6, 7, 9)
 Mickey Curry – drums (2, 8, 10)
 John Scarpulla – baritone saxophone (3, 5, 6), tenor saxophones (3, 5, 6)
 Charles DeChant – tenor saxophone (3, 5, 6)
 David Mann – tenor saxophone (3, 5, 6)
 Barry Danielian – trumpet (3, 5, 6)
 Larry Gold – horn arrangements (3, 5, 6), string arrangements (9)
 March Fry – backing vocals (3, 4, 5)
 Klyde Jones – backing vocals (3), bass (5, 6)
 Everett Bradley – backing vocals (6)

Production 
 Producers – Daryl Hall, Greg Bieck and Paul Pesco.
 Additional Producers – John Fields and T-Bone Wolk
 Engineers – Greg Bieck and Peter Moshay
 Recorded at A-Pawling Studios (Pawling, NY); Red House Studios (Bedfordshire, England); Studio 44 (Monster, Holland); Afro Head Studios.
 Mixed by Michael Brauer at Electric Lady Studios (New York, NY).
 Package Design – Kathy Phillips at Phillips Design.
 Photography – Mark Maglio (cover and interior shots); Elliot Lewis (back cover interior shots); Paul Pesco and Peter Moshay.
 Management – Jonathan Wolfson at Wolfson Entertainment, Inc.

References 

Daryl Hall albums
2011 albums
Albums produced by John Fields (record producer)
Verve Records albums